Petershill Park is a leisure centre and football stadium located in the Springburn suburb of Glasgow, the largest city in Scotland. It has a third generation full-size outdoor football pitch, and has floodlights.

It is host to the men's West of Scotland Football League football sides Petershill and Rossvale. The women's football teams Glasgow City, Glasgow Girls and Partick Thistle Women also play their home games at the stadium. It is known locally as The Peasy which is also the nickname of the Petershill club.

History
Before moving into the new modernised facility, Petershill had spent most of their existence (from 1935 until 2005) playing at the old Petershill Park. In 2005, it was demolished and replaced with a modern structure that could also be used by the local community. This was also to be known as Petershill Park.

Facilities
The stadium can also hold up to 2,000 spectators, with one stand (known as the main stand) containing 500 seats. This stand is attached to the club building, containing a bar, a function room, gymnasium, dance studio and health suite. Opposite the main stand is two steps of terracing, with a business centre located next to the right side of the main stand. To the left of the main stand, is more terracing. The centre also has a full-size football pitch, plus a number of 5-a-side pitches.

UEFA club matches 
Over the two spells that Glasgow City have used the venue as a home ground, Petershill has played host to UEFA Women's Champions League football. Memorable matches have included a heavy defeat against German giants Turbine Potsdam in 2011 and a British clash with Arsenal in the last 16 in 2013.

After a spell at the Excelsior Stadium, City returned to Petershill in mid-2017 and their Last 32 Champions League tie v BIIK Kazygurt was shown on the BBC Sport website on what was a dramatic encounter which Glasgow City won 4–1 but lost out on away goals after the aggregate scoreline finished 4–4.

Accessibility
The ground is only walking distance away from the railway stations, Barnhill and Springburn. By road, it is located next to the A803 leading onto the M8 a mile away.

References

External links
Football Ground Map - Petershill Park

Petershill F.C.
Football venues in Glasgow
Sports venues completed in 2007
Glasgow City F.C.
Springburn
Rossvale F.C.
Rangers W.F.C.
Scottish Women's Premier League venues